William O. Smith  may refer to:

 William Orlando Smith (1859–1932), U.S. Representative from the state of Pennsylvania
 William Osborne Smith (1833–1887), first Acting Commissioner of the North West Mounted Police
 William Owen Smith (1848–1929), lawyer in Hawaii
 Bill Smith (jazz musician) (William Overton Smith, born 1926)

See also
William Smith (disambiguation)